Mayhem Festival 2010 was the third annual Mayhem Festival created by Kevin Lyman. The 2010 edition of the festival was co-headlined by Korn and Rob Zombie. As in previous years, the main sponsor of the festival is Rockstar Energy drink, and each date had a different Battle of the Bands winner performing on the Jägermeister stage. In addition to three stages with various heavy metal bands, Mayhem Festival 2010 also hosted other entertainment acts. As in previous years, the Freestyle Motocross stunt team Metal Mulisha returned, in addition to comedian Jay Oakerson and a costume party/variety act "Beacher's Madhouse" featuring DJs and the scantily-clad "Beacher's Babies".

In April 2010, an oil rig in the Gulf of Mexico owned by Transocean and operated under contract for BP, exploded, which led to a massive oil spill in a disaster known as the Deepwater Horizon oil spill. At this time, several people around the world, including Mayhem Festival 2010 headliner Korn, decided to boycott BP by not purchasing their fuel. Jonathan Davis, the lead singer of Korn commented, "We need to do our part to let BP know there are consequences for causing something like this. We want to send a message to corporations like BP so that they will take more preventive measures in the future." Korn will not be using BP, or oil from partnering companies, to fuel their tour buses during upcoming concert dates and also encouraged the other 2010 Mayhem Festival bands to participate in the boycott. Several artists not on the Mayhem Festival later joined in on Korn's boycott, including Disturbed, Rise Against, and Megadeth. Korn's encouragement for Mayhem bands to join the boycott eventually made its way to tour founder Kevin Lyman, who decided the entire festival would not be using BP oil. In a press release, Lyman stated that he is, "encouraging everyone we deal with to find alternative ways to get down the road this summer."

Mayhem Festival 2010 lineup

Main stage
 Korn
 Rob Zombie
 Lamb of God
 Avenged Sevenfold (July 25 and 27 only)
 Five Finger Death Punch

Silver Star Stage
 Atreyu
 Norma Jean
 In This Moment
 3 Inches of Blood

Jägermeister stage
 Hatebreed
 Chimaira
 Shadows Fall (cancelled August 10 and 11, replaced by The Athiarchists for those dates)
 Winds of Plague* (cancelled August 10 and 11)
 Jägermeister Battle of the Bands winner

Note: Despite being announced as performing on the Jägermeister stage on press releases, Winds of Plague performed on the Silver Star stage on most of the tour dates.

Tour dates

References

External links

Mayhem Festival by year
2010 concert tours
2010 music festivals
2010 festivals in the United States
July 2010 events in the United States
August 2010 events in the United States